Nixon is a census-designated place (CDP) in Butler County, Pennsylvania, United States. The population was 1,373 at the 2010 census.

Geography
Nixon is located in Penn Township at  (40.785683, -79.937926). Pennsylvania Route 8 passes through the CDP, leading north  to Butler and south  to downtown Pittsburgh.

Demographics

As of the census of 2000, there were 1,404 people, 508 households, and 419 families residing in the CDP. The population density was 526.7 people per square mile (203.0/km). There were 529 housing units at an average density of 198.4/sq mi (76.5/km). The racial makeup of the CDP was 98.08% White, 0.28% African American, 1.35% Asian, 0.07% from other races, and 0.21% from two or more races. Hispanic or Latino of any race were 0.78% of the population.

There were 508 households, out of which 34.4% had children under the age of 18 living with them, 74.0% were married couples living together, 5.5% had a female householder with no husband present, and 17.5% were non-families. 15.4% of all households were made up of individuals, and 7.5% had someone living alone who was 65 years of age or older. The average household size was 2.67 and the average family size was 2.98.

In the CDP, the population was spread out, with 24.1% under the age of 18, 4.4% from 18 to 24, 26.0% from 25 to 44, 28.4% from 45 to 64, and 17.1% who were 65 years of age or older. The median age was 43 years. For every 100 females, there were 110.5 males. For every 100 females age 18 and over, there were 105.0 males.

The median income for a household in the CDP was $58,864, and the median income for a family was $65,759. Males had a median income of $48,550 versus $29,423 for females. The per capita income for the CDP was $27,269. About 3.3% of families and 3.4% of the population were below the poverty line, including none of those under age 18 and 14.6% of those age 65 or over.

References

Census-designated places in Butler County, Pennsylvania
Census-designated places in Pennsylvania